Earth Abides is a 1949 American post-apocalyptic science fiction novel by George R. Stewart. The novel  tells the story of the fall of civilization from deadly disease and the emergence of a new culture with simpler tools. Set in the 1940s in Berkeley, California, the story is told by Isherwood Williams, who emerges from isolation in the mountains to find almost everyone dead.

Earth Abides won the inaugural International Fantasy Award in 1951. It was included in Locus Magazine's list of best All Time Science Fiction in 1987 and 1998 and was a nominee to be entered into the Prometheus Hall of Fame. In November 1950, it was adapted for the CBS radio program Escape as a two-part drama starring John Dehner.

Plot

"Part I: World Without End"
While working on his graduate thesis in geography in the Sierra Nevada mountains, Ish is bitten by a rattlesnake. As he heals from the bite in a cabin, he gets sick with a disease similar to measles, and he lapses in and out of consciousness. He eventually recovers and makes his way back to civilization, only to discover that it has utterly collapsed after most people have died from the same disease. He decides to go to his home in Berkeley, California. In the city near his home Ish meets few human survivors and also encounters a friendly and eager dog, which he names Princess, who swiftly adopts Ish as her new master. He sets out on a cross-country tour, traveling all the way to New York City and back, scavenging for food and fuel as he goes. As he travels, he finds small groups of survivors, but has doubts about humanity's ability to survive the loss of civilization.

Ish returns to his home in California. After reading Ecclesiastes, he realizes that he had been throwing his life away and then finds a woman, Emma, living nearby. They agree to consider themselves married and have children. They are gradually joined by other survivors. Over time the electricity fails and the comforts of civilization recede. As the children grow, Ish tries to instill basic academics by teaching reading, writing, arithmetic, and geography, but he is largely unsuccessful due to a lack of interest by the others.

Many children are born in these years, including Joey, Ish's youngest and favorite son. Joey is very similar in nature to Ish, as he demonstrates innate intelligence and a curiosity about the world before the epidemic. This leads Ish to believe that Joey is the key to the future.

"Part II: The Year 22"

Twenty-two years later, the community flourishes, with the younger generation adapting easily to the more traditional world. They come to have a better grasp of the natural world than the adults, and when running water fails, the younger generation comes to the rescue, knowing where flowing streams may be found. Ish turns his attention from ecology to his newly forming society, and he notices that the children are becoming very superstitious. One day Ish asks for his hammer which he habitually carries around, and finds the children are afraid to touch it as it is a symbol to them of the old times; the long-dead "Americans" of the old world are now viewed like gods, including Ish.

The older boys return from a cross country trip with a stranger named Charlie, who exposes the tribe to typhoid fever which kills many, including Joey. Through his despair, Ish is forced to face the future with a different set of expectations and hopes.  His ambition to restore civilization to its original state is replaced by a more modest, practical one to simply convey a few basic survival skills; such as making bows and arrows, which the children think are great playthings.

As the years go by, the community begins to grow corn. Ish presides at meetings, his hammer being a symbol of his status. Though he is respected, many of his ideas are ignored by the younger men.

"Part III: The Last American"

Ish spends most of his elderly life in a fog, unaware of the world. Occasionally the fog in his mind lifts. During one such time, he finds himself aware of his great-grandson Jack, who stands before him. Jack tells him that the bow and arrow have become more reliable than the gun, whose cartridges do not always work. Jack also mentions that different colored arrowheads are suitable for hunting different game. Ish finds this belief superstitious, but decides it would be futile to challenge it. Ish realizes that the former civilization is now completely gone and will not be rebuilt anytime soon. He becomes reconciled to the way things have changed. When Ish is dying, the younger men insist that his hammer be passed on. Ish chooses Jack.

Characters
Isherwood Williams (Ish) is a graduate student at Berkeley, studying the geography of an area in the mountains, somewhere in California.  He is sometimes referred to in the book as "The Last American."  Ish becomes the leader of the community, aka "the tribe", he believes due to his intellect.  His nickname, Ish, is an obvious reference to Ishi, the "last Wild Indian."  Ish is also the word for "man" in Hebrew.

Emma (Em) is a woman who Isherwood meets in his hometown. The author may have been taking a chance with this character, who is, at least partially, African-American, while Isherwood is white; when the book was written, interracial marriages were heavily discouraged in American society. Isherwood does marry her, and race isn't important to the couple's relationship. Em ("mother" in Hebrew) becomes the community's mother, letting it grow as it will, but stepping in to help when no one else is filling the leadership role. She is the adult while others panic, and Ish thinks of her as the "Mother of Nations". In her old age, she disagrees with Ish about a request by a smaller community, known as the Others, to join the Tribe. Ish initially opposes the idea, but Em supports it, and Ish changes his mind.

Ezra meets Emma and Ish while traveling through Berkeley, he was a former liquor salesman and immigrant from Yorkshire, England. They liked him, but feared the complications of a love triangle, so they encouraged him to leave. He returned with Molly and Jean, his wives. Ish values Ezra as a good judge of people, saying "Ezra knew people, Ezra liked people."

George is a carpenter by trade. George is not intellectually intelligent but becomes a Jack-of-all-trades able to build, repair or maintain the limited infrastructure of the small community.

Evie is a "half grown girl" who Ezra found living "in squalor and solitude."  She appears to have a mental illness, and the others all care and provide for her. Evie grows into an attractive young woman but the tribe has a rule, that as the children grow no one will marry her—she wouldn't understand, and her mental condition could possibly be hereditary.

Joey is the youngest son of Ish and Em. Of all the children in the Tribe, he is the only one that truly understands the academic skills that Ish tries to teach — geometry, reading, geography. He dies during the typhoid fever outbreak.

Charlie is a stranger who arrives from Los Angeles after two of the "boys" (the second generation) make a scouting expedition in a refurbished Jeep to see what is left of America. Immediately upon his arrival Ish and Ezra become suspicious about Charlie and the type of person he might be. Their suspicions are confirmed a day later when Charlie sets his eye on Evie. He also reveals to Ezra after drinking heavily that he has had many of "Cupid's" diseases. Ish confronts Charlie about Evie, Charlie is disrespectful and challenges Ish's authority as leader. It is revealed that Charlie carries a concealed pistol and his behavior reveals himself as someone who was probably a violent criminal before the epidemic. As a result, Ish, Em, Ezra and George debate what to do about Charlie for the safety of the community, exile or execution. Charlie is the carrier of the typhoid epidemic that infects the community.

Jack is Ish's great-grandson. He's a young man who hunts with arrows he makes himself. Jack is confident, intelligent and a potential leader, and Ish sees something of Joey in him; although he has beliefs which to Ish seem superstitious and naive. Like others of his generation, Jack believes Ish's old hammer is something very important for the Tribe. He risks his life by going into a burning house to retrieve the hammer.  A little later, as Ish is dying, the young men want to know who the hammer will now belong to, and Ish chooses Jack.

Major themes

Biological controls on population
On the title page Stewart immediately starts with the theme, quoting Ecclesiastes 1:4 — "Men go and come, but earth abides." For the first half of Earth Abides, George R. Stewart concentrates on a major theme for the book, that humans have no privileged place in nature and are not immune to nature's built-in population controls. The main character, a geographer, states it plainly, "When anything gets too numerous it's likely to get hit by some plague".

On the first page Stewart tells readers how contagion could bring the end very quickly for mankind:

Within a few pages he makes it clear that basic biology applies to humans too:

Effects of smaller population
Reviewer Noel Perrin has pointed out that George R. Stewart had written two books before this, in which the main character was not a person, but "a natural force."  In Storm the main character is weather, and in Fire, a forest fire takes center stage.

In the same way, Stewart centers the first half of Earth Abides on the forces of natural and artificial selection. In freeing the landscape from humans, half of the book is devoted to looking at how the world would change in their absence. Stewart chose to make his main human character an ecologist, and sends him on a cross-country tour, to see what the world is like without people. As animals and plants no longer have humans taking care of them or controlling them, they are free to breed uncontrolled and to prey upon one another. The main character sees that some have been under humans so long that they are helpless in the face of change, while others are still able to adapt and survive. Stewart shows that humans have routinely influenced the lives of almost every plant and animal around them.

Another theme of the book is what happens to human skills as the population decreases. Reviewer Lionel Shriver points out this theme in an article about literature which features human extinction:

Stewart uses the second half of his book to show that, if humans are reduced to low numbers, it will be difficult for them to continue civilization as we know it. Reading becomes a casualty.

If skills and customs don't work in the new situation, these die out, or those holding them do. Children adapt naturally to the new situation, and immediately useful customs and skills are more interesting to them than reading and writing. The information in libraries is useless within a generation.

One custom that Stewart predicts could die out is racism. When there are fewer partners to choose from, mankind will not be able to afford to be too choosy in picking one's partner.

Another issue he brings up is how law and order will function, when the lawmakers, courts and enforcers are all gone. Even laws won't be immune to the pressure to survive. One of the characters in the book point out, "What laws?" when they have to determine the fate of an outsider. Stewart shows how people may come to worry about potential harm rather than justice when dealing with outsiders.

Biblical theme: replenishing the Earth
Having explored the depopulated Earth, Stewart shifts his thematic focus in part 2 and 3, from the biological theme of population crash to a biblical theme of populating the world.

A 1949 book review says that Earth Abides parallels two biblical stories that shows mankind spreading out and populating the world:

Stewart, who specialized in meanings of names, chose names in Hebrew that have appropriate meanings for the biblical theme; this couple who restart the human tribe are symbolically man and mother. In Stewart’s day, most Hebrew dictionaries stated that Ish means "man" (although a more accurate English equivalent is "participant"), and Em means "mother". Both terms figure prominently in the biblical story of Adam and Eve: Ish in Genesis 2:23, and Em in Genesis 3:20.

In addition to the Hebraic names in Earth Abides, the story also has a symbol in common with biblical tradition—the snake. Ish encounters a rattlesnake; before this event he is part of a larger civilization. After it bites him, his world changes, just as the snake changes Adam's world in the Genesis story. Adam loses paradise, and Ish finds civilization dead.

Aside from the biblical origin of Ish, there is another tale of the fall of civilization that George R. Stewart could have taken account of, the story of Ishi, believed, at the time Stewart was writing, to be the last of his tribe, who lived at Berkeley, where Stewart later taught.
Ish is very similar to Ishi, and it also means "man", in the language of a man whose whole tribe was dead. Ishi's story parallels the Genesis and Earth Abides stories, telling of one who has to adapt to a changed world.

Genre and style

Earth Abides belongs to the subgenre of apocalyptic science fiction featuring a universal plague that nearly wipes out humanity. Other examples include Mary Shelley's The Last Man (1826), Jack London's The Scarlet Plague (1912), Michael Crichton's The Andromeda Strain (1969) and Stephen King's The Stand (1978).

Earth Abides also fits into the "post-apocalyptic" subgenre. It was published in 1949, four years after the end of World War II and in the earliest stages of the Cold War. While post-apocalyptic fiction is now quite common, Earth Abides distinctly predates many similar well-known novels including Alas, Babylon (1959), A Canticle for Leibowitz (1960), and The Last Ship (1988). It is predated, however by The Machine Stops (1909), and René Barjavel's Ashes, Ashes (Ravage, 1943), among others.

A common theme of post-apocalyptic works is, "What if the world we know no longer exists," and each of these books paints a different picture of the future.  Earth Abides explores such issues as family structure, education, the meaning and purpose of civilization, and the basic nature of humankind — especially in regard to religion, superstition, and custom. As it was written in the beginning years of the Cold War, it lacks some common post-apocalyptic conventions found in later novels: There are no warlords or biker gangs (as in Mad Max), no fear of atomic weapons or radiation, and no mutants or warring tribes (as in A Canticle for Leibowitz). When the main character in Earth Abides travels through the country, he notices little sign of there having been violence or civil unrest during the plague period. Many areas seem to have been evacuated, and only in or near hospitals are there large numbers of corpses.

Reception

According to WorldCat.org, there have been 28 editions of Earth Abides published in English. The book has been in print in every decade from 1949 to 2008.

James Sallis, writing in 2003 in the Boston Globe:

Astounding reviewer P. Schuyler Miller identified the novel as one of the first regarding "a young and little understood science, the science of ecology." Miller praised Stewart for "the intricacy of detail with which he has worked out his problem in ecology" and for writing "quietly, with very few peaks of melodrama as seem necessary in much popular fiction."

It was mentioned in a serious overview of modern science fiction, Contemporary Science Fiction by August Derleth, in the January 1952 edition of College English. Derleth called it an "excellent example" of the "utopian theme" of "rebuilding after a holocaust leaving but few survivors."

It was described as a persuasive answer to the question, "What is man," in the October, 1973 edition of Current Anthropology. The article "Anthropology and Science Fiction"  examines the nature of Science Fiction and its relationship to understanding people. The magazine concluded of Earth Abides that it shows ..."man is man, be he civilized or tribal. Stewart shows us that a tribal hunting culture is just as valid and real to its members as civilization is to us."

In the American Quarter article California's Literary Regionalism, Autumn 1955, George R. Stewart is seen as a "humanist in the old classical sense. His novels, Storm, Fire, East of the Giants, Earth Abides, demonstrate the complex interlocking of topography, climate, and human society; and their general tone is objective and optimistic."

References to other works
The book makes a reference to Robinson Crusoe and The Swiss Family Robinson. Ish compares the situations within these books to what he is going through. He finds Robinson Crusoe less appealing, because "his religious preoccupations seemed boring and rather silly". He looks at the ship in The Swiss Family Robinson as an "infinite grab-bag from which at any time they might take exactly what they wanted," which is similar to the situation of those living after the Great Disaster.

Stewart also mentions Ecclesiastes 1:4 in the title and theme: "Men go and come, but Earth abides".

Legacy and homages
 Stephen King has stated that Earth Abides was an inspiration for his post-apocalyptic novel, The Stand.
 Composer Philip Aaberg wrote a piece of music, titled "Earth Abides", inspired by the novel. The piece was originally written as part of a sound track commissioned by the National Geographic Society for a documentary on the Earth. The track can be found on the Windham Hill CD "A Winter's Solstice III" (track 15).
 Jimi Hendrix claimed that Earth Abides was his favorite book and his song "Third Stone from the Sun" is inspired by the novel.

Footnotes

References
 
 
 
 
 
 
 
 
 
 
 
 
 Stewart, George R. (1969). Earth Abides. Boston: Houghton Mifflin Company.

External links
 Boston Globe review by James Sallis 
 Review by Rich Cross at Survivors: A World Away
 Review and Discussion on We Read Science Fiction  #3 All-Time Best Science Fiction Novel
 A large version of the painting by Robert Abbett for the 1962 Ace Books cover. 
 Two versions of the painting for the Ace Books cover and blurbs about the book
 Earth Abides book covers
 Art Elliot, Earth Abides EP
 George R. Stewart weblog by Stewart biographer Donald M. Scott

Audio 
 Escape "Earth Abides" Part One (November 5, 1950)
 Escape "Earth Abides" Part Two (November 12, 1950)

1949 American novels
1949 science fiction novels
American post-apocalyptic novels
American science fiction novels
Books about the San Francisco Bay Area
Environmental fiction books
Libertarian science fiction books
Novels by George Rippey Stewart
Post-apocalyptic novels
Social science fiction
Fiction set in 1949
Fiction set in 1971
Novels about viral outbreaks
Random House books